Chahal may refer to:

Places associated with Chahals
 Chahal, Kasur, a village in West Punjab (Pakistan)
 Chahal, Guatemala, a municipality in Guatemala
Chahal Kalan, a village in Batala, Gurdaspur district, Punjab, India
Sallo Chahal, a village in Batala, Gurdaspur district, Punjab, India
Janian Chahal, village in Shahkot, Jalandhar district, Punjab, India
Chahal Kalan, village in Batala, Gurdaspur District, Punjab, India
Chahal Konar, village in Tashan-e Gharbi District, Behbahan County, Khuzestan Province, Iran

People
Ajit Chahal (born 1995), Indian cricketer
Gavie Chahal (born 1978), Indian actor
Gulzar Inder Chahal, Indian film actor
Gurbaksh Chahal (born 1982), Indian-American internet entrepreneur
Jessy Chahal, Malaysian actress and TV host
Kavita Chahal (born 1985), Indian boxer
Mahek Chahal (born 1979), Norwegian actress and model
Nahla Chahal, Lebanese writer, journalist, researcher and activist
Randa Chahal, Lebanese film director, producer and screenwriter
Saimo Chahal, British lawyer
Simi Chahal, Indian film actress
Sonia Chahal, Indian boxer
Yuzvendra Chahal (born 1990), Indian cricketer and chess player